The local–express lane system is an arrangement of carriageways within a major highway where long distance traffic can use lanes with fewer interchanges compared to local traffic which use 'local' or 'collector' lanes that have access to all interchanges. This can also be called a collector–distributor lane within a single interchange. One of the longest examples is Highway 401 in Toronto, 
where highway ramps between express and local/collector lanes cross over one another; these are commonly known as braided ramps.

Given the considerable overall width of this design, new suburban freeways are often designed with interchanges spaced far enough apart to avoid the need for parallel roadways.

Some local-express lane configurations consist of express toll lanes, in which drivers must pay a toll to use the express lanes.

Examples

The following examples include both local–express lanes and collector–distributor lanes.

Canada

United States

Other countries

Gallery

Example of cloverleaf interchanges
A cloverleaf interchange may have collector–distributor lanes on a freeway or expressway to handle entering and exiting traffic. Usually, this lane will begin as an entrance-only ramp initially, but it will sometimes become a main lane or possibly an exit-only lane. The purpose of this lane is to facilitate traffic to the freeway exits and from the freeway entrances.

See also 
 Frontage road

References

External links

Road traffic management
Types of roads